Nanjing West railway station is a railway station in Nanjing, China. Originally named Nanjing railway station, it was first opened in 1908. as the end point of the Shanghai–Nanjing Railway (a section of the Beijing–Shanghai Railway).
Later, it also became the starting point of the Nanjing–Tongling Railway.

Located in Nanjing's Xiaguan District, near the southern bank of the Yangtze River, opposite Nanjing North railway station on the northern side of the river (in Pukou), the station was a point where passengers traveling e.g. from Shanghai to Beijing  would have to get off the train and board a river ferry, to resume their northward journey from the other station.

After Nanjing Yangtze River Bridge was built, a new Nanjing railway station was constructed closer to the city center, and the original Nanjing railway station near the river was renamed to Nanjing West railway station, which name it has retained to this day.

By the 21st century, the Nanjing West station saw only a few trains a day. This station suspended passenger services 25 March 2012, and will be converted to a railway museum.

Photos

See also
Nanjing railway station
Nanjing South railway station
Zhonghuamen railway station
Nanjing North railway station

Notes

 

Railway stations in Nanjing
Railway museums in China
Railway stations in China opened in 1908
Railway stations closed in 2012